Hawkeye aka Karate Cops is a martial arts film that was directed by George Chung and Leo Fong. It starred George Chung, Troy Donahue, Chuck Jeffreys, Stan Wertlieb, Hidy Ochiai and Elizabeth Frieje.

Story
The film is set on the Las Vegas Strip. The two main characters are  Alexander “Hawkeye” Hawkamoto from Texas and Charlie Wilson. One is a renegade  cop and the other is a decorated lawman.  Hawkeye the confident karate kicking cop's partner quite convincingly resembles Eddie Murphy's character in Beverly Hills Cop. Hawkeye’s best friend and former partner is involved in a shady deal, and is mysteriously killed by the mob. Hawkeye and Wilson go after the killers and are relentless in their pursuit.  They come up against both the Japanese Yakuza and the Mafia.

Background
The film was shot onto 35mm film and on location in Las Vegas. The film was directed by both George Chung and Leo Fong. The film which was released in 1988 has the alternate title of Karate Cops.

Releases
 Valley Studios - 90 mins

Cast
 George Chung 
 Troy Donahue 
 Elizabeth Frieje 
 Chuck Jeffreys
 Ronnie Lott 
 Michelle McCormick
Richard Norton 
 Hidy Ochiai
 Stan Wertlieb

Crew
 Director of Photography - Frank Harris
 Production Poordinator - Markey Stein
 Executive in Charge of Production - Jerry Brassfield
 Executive Producers - Sunny Lim & George Chung
 Music - Keith Eddy
 Director - Leo Fong

References

External links
 Imdb" Hawkeye
 World Film Geek review
 fist of b-list review
 Comeuppance Reviews Hawkeye (1988)

1988 films
1988 action films
American action films
American independent films
1988 martial arts films
American martial arts films
Films directed by Leo Fong
1980s English-language films
1980s American films